Aerosmith is an American hard rock band from Boston, Massachusetts. Formed in October 1970, the group originally included vocalist Steven Tyler, lead guitarist Joe Perry, rhythm guitarist Ray Tabano, bassist Tom Hamilton and drummer Joey Kramer, although Tabano was replaced by Brad Whitford early the following year. The band's lineup has remained constant for much of its tenure, save for a five-year period between 1979 and 1984. First, Perry left the band after a show on July 28, 1979, when a confrontation between his then-wife Elyssa and Hamilton's wife Terry led to an argument between the guitarist and Tyler, resulting in the former's departure. After contributing to Night in the Ruts as a session guitarist, Jimmy Crespo was invited to replace Perry in Aerosmith in October 1979. Whitford also left Aerosmith in 1981 to work on a solo project with former Ted Nugent guitarist Derek St. Holmes. He was replaced by Rick Dufay, before both Perry and Whitford returned to the band in the spring of 1984.

In addition to the band's regular five-piece lineup, Aerosmith has added several touring musicians since its inception. David Woodford performed saxophone on the band's 1973 self-titled album, and was added to its touring lineup for the subsequent promotional tour. Similarly, keyboardist Scott Cushnie performed on 1975's Toys in the Attic and remained for the album's touring cycle. Mark Radice briefly took on the role of touring keyboardist in early 1978, followed by frequent collaborator Richard Supa in 1980, Bobby Mayo between 1982 and 1983, and Clayton Bruce Ost in 1987. Thom Gimbel joined as Aerosmith's first long-term keyboardist in 1989, remaining with the band until 1995. He was replaced by Russ Irwin beginning with the Nine Lives Tour in 1997, who toured with the band until he was replaced by Buck Johnson in 2014. The 2012–2013 Global Warming Tour featured saxophonist Mindi Abair, percussionist Jesse Sky Kramer (Joey's son) and backing vocalist Melanie Taylor.

Official members

Current members

Former members

Other contributors

Session musicians

Touring musicians

Live substitutes

Timeline

Lineups

Bibliography

References

Aerosmith